Zhang Family Temple is an ancestral shrine located in Xitun District, Taichung City, Taiwan. Built in 1904, the shrine is protected as a city monument.

History 
The Matang Zhang clan (馬堂張家) originated in Ninghua County, Fujian Province and migrated to central Taiwan. In 1870, several Zhang family members established a simple ancestral shrine in a house in Shangniupuzi (上牛埔子). When the land was taken by the Japanese government to build Shuinan Airport, in 1904, family built another shine in its current location of Xiaqizhangli (下七張犁).

After World War II, the Zhang family carried out a series of renovations to the building, including replacing the roof tiles and using concrete to reinforce the structure. On November 27, 1985, the Taichung City Government protected the building as a city monument, but did not protect the left wing because it was heavily altered during the renovations; it would later be protected as a historical building on August 6, 2009.

Architecture 
The shrine complex is a siheyuan that contains ten buildings that are made of different materials: six of rammed earth blocks, two of wood, and two of straw. The main hall is named "Faxiangtang" (發祥堂) and is used for worship. The left wing was used as the private residence for the Zhang family while the right was leased out to farmers; therefore, the two wings are noticeably not symmetrical. There are three wooden plaques (bian'e) that date to the Qing Dynasty.

Gallery

See also 
 Chinese ancestral veneration
 List of temples in Taichung
 List of temples in Taiwan
 Zhang Liao Family Temple
 Lin Family Ancestral Shrine

References 

1904 establishments in Taiwan
Religious buildings and structures completed in 1904
Temples in Taichung
Ancestral shrines in Taiwan